Flitholme is a hamlet in the parish of Musgrave, in the Eden District, in the English county of Cumbria. 


Location
It is located on an unclassified road about a quarter of a mile away from the A66 road.

Nearby settlements 
Nearby settlements include the town of Appleby-in-Westmorland, the villages of Warcop, Great Musgrave, Little Musgrave and Brough under Stainmore and the hamlet of Langrigg.

Eden Valley Railway
The Eden Valley Railway Trust near Warcop operates a heritage railway on the 9.3 km of track from Appleby to Flitholme.

Location grid

References

 Philip's Street Atlas Cumbria (page 104)

Hamlets in Cumbria
Eden District